Hot Hot Hot may refer to:

 "Hot Hot Hot" (Arrow song), a 1982 soca song by Arrow and covered in 1987 by Buster Poindexter and in 2013 by Dutch Europop band The Vengaboys (with additional new lyrics added)
 "Hot Hot Hot!!!" (The Cure song), a 1987 song by The Cure
 "Hot Hot Hot / Mirrors", a 2019 single by Tohoshinki
 Hot Hot Hot (meme), the informal title of a video propagated on the Internet in 2005
 "Hot Hot Hot" (LL Cool J song), a song by LL Cool J from 1998
 Hot Hot Hot (film), a Luxembourg-Austrian-Belgian film from 2011